The 1978–79 British Ice Hockey season featured the Northern League for teams from Scotland and the north of England. A new format was introduced to replace the Southern League for teams from the rest of England. It consisted of two leagues called the Inter-City League and English League North.

Murrayfield Racers won the Northern League, Sheffield Lancers won the English League North and Streatham Redskins won the Inter-City League. Murrayfield Racers won the Icy Smith Cup.

Northern League

English League North

Inter-City League

Icy Smith Cup

Final
Murrayfield Racers defeated Streatham Redskins at Billingham Ice Rink 10-2

Autumn Cup

First round

Group 1

Group 2

Playoffs

Semifinals
Durham Wasps - Murrayfield Racers 5:8 on aggregate (3:3, 3:5)
Whitley Warriors  - Fife Flyers 9:14 on aggregate (4:6, 5:8)

Final
Murrayfield Racers - Fife Flyers 8:15 on aggregate (4:3, 4:12)

References

British
British ice hockey
British ice hockey
British ice hockey
British ice hockey
1979–80 in British ice hockey